John Garvey may refer to:

John Garvey (bishop) (1527–1595), Irish Protestant bishop of Kilmore and archbishop of Armagh
John Garvey (rugby league) (born 1913), English rugby league footballer of the 1930s
John Garvey (musician) (1921–2006), American orchestra leader and academic
John Garvey (soccer) (born 1969), retired American soccer player
John H. Garvey (born 1948), President of The Catholic University of America